Mercury(II) nitrate is an inorganic compound with the formula Hg(NO3)2.xH2O.  These colorless or white soluble crystalline salts are occasionally used as a reagent.  It is made by treating mercury with hot concentrated nitric acid.  Neither anhydrous nor monohydrate has been confirmed by X-ray crystallography.  The anhydrous material is more widely used.

Uses
Mercuric nitrate has been used in mercuration of ketones. Mercuric nitrate was formerly used in carroting felt for hats.

Health information
Mercury compounds are highly toxic.  The use of this compound by hatters and the subsequent mercury poisoning of said hatters is a common theory of where the phrase "mad as a hatter" came from.

See also
 The Hatter
 Mercury poisoning
 Gilding

References

External links
 ATSDR - Toxic Substances Portal - Mercury (11/14/2013)
 ATSDR - Public Health Statement: Mercury (11/14/2013)
 ATSDR - ALERT! Patterns of Metallic Mercury Exposure, 6/26/97 (link not traceable 11/14/2013)
 ATSDR - Medical Management Guidelines for Mercury (11/14/2013)
 ATSDR - Toxicological Profile: Mercury (11/14/2013)
 Safety data (MSDS) (link not traceable 11/14/2013)
 Mercuric Nitrate (ICSC)
 Mercury
 Mercury Information Packages
 How to Make Good Mercury Electrical Connections, Popular Science monthly, February 1919, Unnumbered page, Scanned by Google Books: https://books.google.com/books?id=7igDAAAAMBAJ&pg=PT14

Mercury(II) compounds
Nitrates
Oxidizing agents